The Eastern Cordillera small-footed shrew (Cryptotis brachyonyx) is a species of mammal in the family Soricidae. It resembles C. colombiana. The species is only known from four individuals collected at two localities, the most recent record being from 1925.

References

Cryptotis
Mammals of Colombia
Mammals of the Andes
Endemic fauna of Colombia
Mammals described in 2003